Heimans is a surname. Notable people with the surname include:

Jeremy Heimans, Australian activist
Levi Heimans (born 1985), Dutch cyclist
Ralph Heimans (born 1970), Australian painter

See also
Heiman